The Nokia 3600 slide is a mobile phone by Nokia that was released in August 2008. The phone runs the Series 40 3rd Edition platform. This is classed as the 'low end version' of the Nokia 6600 slide, its major difference being the lack of 3G support.

Features

Operating frequency
Quad band GSM / GPRS / EDGE: GSM 850, GSM 900, GSM 1800, GSM 1900
Music
Music player supports MP3, MP4, AAC, eAAC+ & WMA audio formats
Up to 10 hours of music playback
Stereo headset included with automatic music muting for incoming calls
Stereo FM radio - FM radio requires headset to be attached
Manage your music on your compatible PC with Nokia Music Manager or Windows Media Player 10 and 11
Imaging and video
3.2-megapixel camera (2048 x 1536 resolution) with autofocus, 8x digital zoom, and dual LED flash
Video Recording supports VGA at 15fps, and QVGA at 30fps
Video playback supports MP4, 3pp
Video streaming
Local video playback: up to 30fps in VGA for H263 and MPEG-4 with 2048 kbit/s bitrate
Video to TV-Out: up to 15fps in QVGA with the Nokia Video-Out Cable CA-92U (not included)
Still picture to TV-Out in VGA with the Nokia Video-Out Cable CA-92U (not included)
Manage your videos with Nokia Video Manager
Display
2" (320 x 240 pixels) QVGA display supporting up to 16.7 million colors
Connectivity
MicroUSB connector
2.5mm AV connector
2mm charging connector
USB 2.0 Full Speed for rapid music transfer
Remote SyncML data synchronisation via Bluetooth
Packet Data
Bluetooth 2.0 with stereo audio profiles for wireless music listening and control
Connects to the Nokia Bluetooth GPS Module LD-4W(not included) for GPS location with Nokia Maps
OMA DRM 2.0 and Windows Media DRM for digital content protection
Device updates with FOTA (firmware over the air)
Browsing
Opera Mini v4 browser
xHTML support
WML (WAP 2.0) support
HTTP/TCP/IP connection
Memory
64 MB internal memory of which 30 MB is available for user data
Expandable using microSD card supports up to 4 GB
Communication
Windows Live Messenger Mobile
Flickr
Opera Mini
Text messaging (SMS)
Multimedia Messaging
Audio messaging service (AMS) for sending voice clips over-the-air
Email client supporting IMAP4, POP3, and SMTP protocols, with a user-friendly setup wizard
Video Call Acceptance
Download
Yahoo! Go
Plug and play mobile services
Supports Java MIDP 2.0 applications
Power management
BL-4S Battery
Up to 5 hrs talk time
Up to 14.2 days standby time
860 mAh

References

http://www.nokiausa.com/find-products/phones/nokia-3600-slide/specifications

Related handsets
 Nokia 6500 slide
 Nokia 6600 fold
 Nokia 6600 slide

External links
 Nokia 3600 slide 

3600
Slider phones
Mobile phones introduced in 2008